Müllrose (Lower Sorbian: Miłoraz) is a town in the Oder-Spree district, in Brandenburg, Germany. It is situated on the Oder-Spree Canal, 15 km southwest of Frankfurt (Oder). A part of the city is located in the Schlaube Valley Nature Park, named after the Schlaube, a 20 kilometres long river.

Overview
Müllrose is also situated at the northern bank of the Großer Müllroser See, a lake between Müllrose in the north and the municipality Mixdorf in the south. The watermill Müllrose was first mentioned in a document in 1275 and is still in use today.

Demography

References

External links

Localities in Oder-Spree